Ruiloba is a municipality in Cantabria Province, Spain.

References

Municipalities in Cantabria